The Crown Point Road Race Circuit was an automobile race course located in northwest Indiana, and operated only during the summer of 1909. The majority of the course was on rural highways, with several long straightaways, one exceeding . The course also went through the towns of Crown Point, Lowell and Cedar Lake. In preparation for use as a race course, pedestrian bridges were built over the road (as well as one large enough to accommodate horses), several grandstands were erected, and nine telegraph stations were in place to relay news to the spectators. The feature event was the Cobe Trophy Race, promoted by the Chicago Automobile Club and its president, Ira Cobe. The day before, the Indiana Trophy Race was held for smaller cars (those with engines of less than 300 cubic inch displacement). Five drivers competed in both races (including Cobe Trophy winner Louis Chevrolet). Ultimately, the course was a commercial disappointment, as spectators chose to watch from the miles of open countryside, and bring their own picnics, rather than pay for the grandstands and concessions offered by the promoters.

Race results

"1909 Cobe Cup Race Route"

Sources

"The Cobe Cup Auto Race of 1909;" Lowell Tribune; Apr. 28, 1998 (on line at http://www.lowellpl.lib.in.us/s1998apr.htm).

"Crowds Expected At Cobe Trophy;" New York Times; April 4, 1909.

https://web.archive.org/web/20111226011449/http://www.motorsport.com/stats/champ/byyear.asp?Y=1909

http://www.champcarstats.com/year/1909.htm

Motorsport venues in Indiana
Defunct motorsport venues in the United States
Buildings and structures in Lake County, Indiana